William Lount,  (March 3, 1840 – April 24, 1903) was an Ontario lawyer and political figure. He represented Simcoe North in the 1st Parliament of Ontario and Toronto Centre in the House of Commons of Canada as a Liberal member from 1896 to 1897.

He was born in Holland Landing in Upper Canada in 1840, the son of George Lount. He was educated at the University of Toronto, studied law and was called to the bar in 1863. Lount practiced law in Barrie and, later, in Toronto. He was named Queen's Counsel in Ontario in 1876 and in the Dominion of Canada in 1881. He resigned his seat in the House of Commons in 1897. In 1901, he was named a justice in the Common Pleas division of the High Court of Ontario. He died in Toronto while still a judge at the age of 63.

He was married twice: to a Miss Orris in 1874 and to Isabelle Hornibrook in 1893.

His uncle, Samuel Lount, was executed for his part in the Upper Canada Rebellion.

References

External links
 
 

1840 births
1903 deaths
Canadian King's Counsel
Judges in Ontario
Members of the House of Commons of Canada from Ontario
Liberal Party of Canada MPs
Ontario Liberal Party MPPs
University of Toronto alumni